Kaksi Vihtoria ("Two Henpecked Husbands") is a 1939 Finnish film directed by Nyrki Tapiovaara. It is based on a play by Tatu Pekkarinen. The film was released on 5 February 1939.

Klaara and Vihtori were the Finnish names of Maggie and Jiggs from the comic strip Bringing Up Father.

Cast
 Annie Mörk as Klaara Rantamo
 Sointu Kouvo as Hilkka Rantamo
 Eino Jurkka as Vihtori Rantamo
 Arvi Tuomi as Vihtori Hiltunen
 Helmer Kaski as Robert Hokkanen
 Irja Rannikko as Augusta
 Jalmari Parikka as Old Karelian man
 Hertta Leistén as Innkeeper
 Lida Salin as Miina
 Varma Lahtinen as Mandi

References

External links
 

1939 films
Finnish films based on plays
Films directed by Nyrki Tapiovaara
Finnish black-and-white films
1939 comedy-drama films
Finnish comedy-drama films